Brintrup is a surname. Notable people with the surname include:

Georg Brintrup (born 1950), German film director, screenwriter, and producer
Sybil Brintrup (1954–2020), Chilean conceptual artist